Odites carterella is a moth in the family Depressariidae. It was described by Lord Walsingham in 1891. It is found in Gambia.

The wingspan is about 15 mm. The forewings are shining pale stramineous ochreous, with a very short dark brown basal patch, of which the outer margin is slightly bulged below the middle. The hindwings are shining whitish, with a faint greyish ochreous tinge.

References

Moths described in 1891
Odites
Taxa named by Edward Meyrick